The 1990 All-Ireland Senior Ladies' Football Championship Final was the twelfth All-Ireland Final and the deciding match of the 1990 All-Ireland Senior Ladies' Football Championship, an inter-county ladies' Gaelic football tournament for the top teams in Ireland.

Margaret Lawlor scored a goal after 15 minutes and Kerry won easily to complete an unprecedented nine-in-a-row.

References

!
All-Ireland Senior Ladies' Football Championship Finals
Kerry county ladies' football team matches
Laois county ladies' football team matches
All-Ireland